Elections to Berwickshire District Council were held in May 1992, the same day as the other Scottish local government elections. The election was the last for the Berwickshire District Council, as the council would be replaced with the Scottish Borders unitary authority for the 1995 election.

Election results

Ward results

References

1992 Scottish local elections
1992